1989 JSL Cup Final was the 14th final of the JSL Cup competition. The final was played at Toyohashi Football Stadium in Aichi on September 16, 1989. Nissan Motors won the championship.

Overview
Defending champion Nissan Motors won their 2nd title, by defeating Yamaha Motors 1–0 with Takashi Mizunuma goal. Nissan Motors won the title for 2 years in a row.

Match details

See also
1989 JSL Cup

References

JSL Cup
1989 in Japanese football
Yokohama F. Marinos matches
Júbilo Iwata matches